M. jacksoni  may refer to:

 Mallika jacksoni, the Jackson's leaf, a butterfly species found in Africa
 Metridiochoerus jacksoni, an extinct pig species indigenous to the Pliocene and Pleistocene of Africa